This is a list of wars involving the Republic of Guinea-Bissau.

References

 
Guinea-Bissau
Wars